Jules-Anthony Vilsaint (born January 6, 2003) is a Canadian soccer player who plays for Major League Soccer club CF Montréal as a forward.

Early life
Vilsaint began playing youth soccer at age four with CS Delta Laval. He later played with CS St-Laurent and CS Panellinios. In 2020, he moved to Europe and trained with the reserve team of French club Lille. In March 2021, he moved to Belgian club Antwerp, signing a 4 year contract.

Club career
In 2022, Vilsaint began playing with Royal Antwerp II in the third tier Belgian National Division 1, scoring one goal in ten appearances. It was reported that  complications off-the-field, rather than injury, limited aspects of his game time.

In February 2023, Vilsaint joined CF Montréal in Major League Soccer on a two-year contract with option years in 2025 and 2026. The deal included a sell-on clause for Antwerp.

International career
Vilsaint is eligible to play for both Canada and Haiti.

In 2019, Vilsaint was named to a preliminary squad of eligible players for the Haiti U17 side for the 2019 FIFA U-17 World Cup, but was not named to the squad for the tournament.

Vilsaint was named in the a Canadian provisional squad for the 2021 Gold Cup. In April 2022, he was invited to a Canada U20 camp, but did not participate. In May 2022, he was named in Canada's provisional squad for the 2022 CONCACAF U-20 Championship.

Style of play 
First playing as a midfielder, Vilsaint started playing mainly as a centre-forward for Lille, while still also regularly as a winger for Antwerp. He is described as a player with great physical abilities, having a good pace despite his tall stature, able to play in many different attacking positions.

References

External links

2003 births
Living people
Association football forwards
Canadian soccer players
Sportspeople from Quebec
Sportspeople from Montreal
Black Canadian soccer players
Canadian sportspeople of Haitian descent
Canadian expatriate soccer players
Expatriate footballers in Belgium
Canadian expatriate sportspeople in Belgium
Belgian National Division 1 players
Lille OSC players
Royal Antwerp F.C. players
CF Montréal players